Ayumi Hamasaki Countdown Live 2019–2020: Promised Land A is Japanese pop singer Ayumi Hamasaki's 16th Countdown concert DVD. It was released on August 26, 2020. 
Hamasaki performed this concert only once at the Yoyogi National Gymnasium on December 31, 2019.

Upon release, the DVD peaked at No. 6 on the weekly Oricon DVD Chart, while the Blu-ray reached No. 9. By the end of 2020, the DVD version reached No. 96 on the Oricon Yearly Music DVD Chart. In addition, it sold a total of 11,543 copies with 6,973 DVD versions and 4,570 Blu-ray versions being sold.

It was released in four formats: a DVD version, a Blu-ray version, a DVD+2CD+Goods version and a Blu-ray+2CD+Goods version. The latter two are limited TeamAyu/mu-mo editions, which include a physical CD version of the songs "Ohia no Ki" and "Dreamed a Dream".

Background information
This was Hamasaki's first New Year's Eve concert to be performed at the Yoyogi National Gymnasium in 3 years. She had previously performed all of her countdown live concerts there from 2000 until 2016.

The DVD/Blu-ray release makes this her first countdown live to receive a standalone release in 5 years, after having released Ayumi Hamasaki Countdown Live 2014–2015 A: Cirque de Minuit on April 8, 2015. Those who ordered the limited edition of the release were able to access an online preview of the concert.

Additionally, this marks Hamasaki's first concert after giving birth in November of the same year.

Release
The concert was released on August 26, 2020 in four different formats. The first two are a standard DVD version and Blu-ray version. The other two formats are a DVD+2CD+Goods version and a Blu-ray+2CD+Goods version. The latter two versions are limited editions that can only be bought through TeamAyu or Mu-mo.

The limited edition comes in a deluxe jacket case and will include two CDs – a live album of the concert and a physical copy of Hamasaki's latest singles "Ohia no Ki" and "Dreamed a Dream", which were released digitally on July 5, and July 31, 2020. Additionally, the limited edition also includes an aurora tote bag which is decorated in a monogram pattern. The bag comes with two carrying handles and features Hamasaki's signature "A" logo, as well as the concert's logo.

Track listing

Charts

References

2020 video albums
Ayumi Hamasaki video albums
Avex Group video albums